The following is a list of characters which appear on Nickelodeon's animated television series El Tigre: The Adventures of Manny Rivera.

Main characters

Manny Rivera/El Tigre
 Voice Actor: Alanna Ubach

Manuel Pablo Gutierrez O'Brian Equihua "Manny" Rivera is a 13-year-old Mexican-born boy who has a scar across his left eye. Manny is the son of the legendary hero White Pantera, the grandson of the evil supervillain Puma Loco and is, himself, the alter ego El Tigre II. Manny is friendly and outgoing, yet does not yet know if he is a hero or a villain (similar to El Tigre I, which may cause him to develop a split personality similar to El Tigre I) giving him an antiheroic personality. He wants to be good for his father, Rodolfo, but can't resist being bad like his grandfather, Grandpapi Rivera, from time to time. When Manny spins his mystical belt buckle, he transforms into the brave and powerful tiger-themed superhero El Tigre. His superhero name translates from Spanish to "The Tiger", which refers to his costume & claws. His powers include sharp, retractable claws that can cut through anything, shooting out his hand like a grappling hook, super strength, and super jumping abilities. In "The Grave Escape", he gained the power to summon an ancient Tiger spirit, creating a large, green, tiger-shaped energy field around himself that mimics his motions. He can be seen as a parody of Spider-Man in most ways. In 2022, series co-creator Jorge R. Gutierrez retroactively described Manny as autistic following his own diagnosis.

Frida Suárez
 Voice Actress: Grey DeLisle
 
A 13-year-old Spanish girl, and the youngest of 3 daughters to Police Chief Emiliano Suárez and Judge Carmela Suárez. Frida is Manny Rivera/El Tigre's best friend/classmate from school and the two hang out together nearly all the time. Frida isn't always the best influence on Manny, and the two are always getting into some kind of mischief. Frida doesn't have any superpowers (save for one brief stint as La Tigresa in the episode bearing the same name), but is always with Manny when he's fighting crime, and is occasionally helpful, even saving Manny a few times. Her father, Police chief Suárez, is fiercely protective of "My Frida" as he calls her, and is none too fond of her hanging out with Manny, thinking it's dangerous being around him, a notion backed up by the fact that she usually gets hurt when he's in his El Tigre persona. Frida is very different from her twin sisters Nikita and Anita, who are both following their father's law enforcement footsteps, and tease Frida for being weird as a result. Frida, on the other hand, has a band named the Atomic Sombreros, is an engineering prodigy, and has a very outgoing attitude towards life, despite being very tomboyish. She dresses in a goth/punk style, complete with bright blue hair, and never goes anywhere without her favorite red goggles atop her head. Frida's archrival is Zoe Aves (a.k.a. Black Cuervo), who has been pulling pranks on her since preschool. Both Frida and Zoe seek the attention of Manny, and much of their rivalry seems to stem from their mutual interest in him. At the end of "No Boots, No Belt, No Brero", Frida proclaims "Kiss me, you fool!" and kisses Manny, suggesting she has had a crush on him all along.

Rodolfo Rivera/White Pantera
 Voice Actor: Eric Bauza

Rodolfo Rivera is Manny's father, Grandpapi's son and is, himself, the alter ego White Pantera II, who is the great-great-great-great-great-grandson of White Pantera I. Pantera can refer to a panther or any member of the panthera genus of cats. He is semi-retired, but has about as much trouble giving up being White Pantera as his father has giving up being Puma Loco (he never removes his magic boots, even when asleep, and only seems to take his mask off to do laundry and shave). Although he often holds a heroic and noble stature, he is easily excited, and tends to get childlike (such as waving his hands and giggling). Opposite of his father, Rodolfo wishes for Manny to become a hero. Although his father is a supervillain, he doesn't seem to hold it against him at all. Even if their views are different, the most he seems to ever do is give Grandpapi a scolding look (which, many times, will cause Grandpapi to back down). He is still in love with his ex-wife Maria; every time he is around her, he flirts with her. He even went as far as to hang a large painting of Maria and is said to have dinner with it every night (though he claims he put it there to "cover a hole"). His source of power are his Bronze Boots of Truth, which give him superhuman speed and strength and make anyone who touches the sole of the boots have to tell the truth. Rodolfo likes grapefruits and is allergic to jug band music (how he could be allergic to music, though, remains to be seen). His name means "White Panther" in Spanish.

Grandpapi/Puma Loco
 Voice Actor: Carlos Alazraqui

Grandpapi Rivera is Manny's grandfather, Rodolfo's father and is, himself, the alter ego Puma Loco II, who is the great-great-great-great-great-grandson of Puma Loco I. His name means "Crazy Puma" in Spanish. He is an supervillain, an anti-supervillain, and mostly, an anti-hero. Opposite of his son Rodolfo, he wants Manny to become a supervillain and will often take Manny with him when committing small crimes. Grandpapi puts his family above all else, even over his supervillainy ways. When his son or grandson is in danger, he will jump in to help them. Even though Grandpapi is semi-retired, he will often commit crimes and take part in other villain activities such as stealing artifacts and stealing peoples' wallets. However, many times Grandpapi ends up returning what he has stolen after being caught by Rodolfo. Grandpapi says he clearly has an honor code, placing family before being a villain. His source of power is the Golden Sombrero of Chaos, which is able to transform into a robotic suit and can produce several different gadgets and weapons such as claws, a giant drill, and even a small hot air balloon, though the most commonly used are missiles. In the episode "Puma Licito", it is revealed that Grandpapi actually owns the house he, Rodolfo, and Manny live in.

Maria Rivera/Plata Peligrosa
 Voice Actress: April Stewart 
Maria Rivera is Manny's mother and Rodolfo's ex-wife. Maria is nice and caring about her family. She dislikes the fact that Manny and Rodolfo are superheroes because she fears for their safety. Because of this, she and Rudolfo split. In the episode "Mother of all Tigres", Maria comes to visit Miracle City after spending years traveling with a mariachi band. When she discovers that Rodolfo is still living the life of a superhero, Manny fears that she will force him to live with her. With the help of Grandpapi and Frida, they set out to make Miracle City look like a safe place. Though they fail in making Miracle City look like a safe place in the end, Maria tells Manny that she already knew about him being El Tigre and that she's moving back to Miracle City to be with him and be the school's new librarian. Oddly enough, she herself doubles as the superheroine, Plata Peligrosa when she was given a Power Gauntlet when she was in college. As a side effect of the gauntlet, it makes Maria fight any villain putting her into overdrive. In Plata Peligrosa's second appearance, Maria and the gauntlet had agreed to collaborate in fighting crime for an hour when Maria wore a timer watch. She gets angry when a superheroine flirts with Rodolfo possibly hinting that she may still love him. The last name of her superheroine alter ego, Peligrosa, is based on the Spanish word "peligro", meaning danger. A running gag during her appearances involves telling her family or friends what she learned from parenting or psychology books relevant to each episode, showing the book itself, and saying "It's a fact".

Rivera family members

El Tigre I
 Voice Actor: Miguel Ferrer

The original El Tigre. He resembles an adult version of Manny and like Manny, could not decide whether to be a hero or a villain. The indecision drove him insane, causing him to develop a split personality. He possesses the same powers as Manny, as well as a few new ones, such as a super powerful roar and the ability to extend his claws to long lengths. He apparently had the ability to cross between the realms of the living and dead with the Ancient Tiger Spirit. He also wears a cape behind him.

Dark Leopard
 Voice Actor: John DiMaggio

Dark Leopard was Manny's ancestor and the first Rivera supervillain, he operates a stone mech suit, and judging by his appearance, was presumably born in the late Mayan (or Mesoamerica) period. He was the son of the original El Tigre.

Golden Leon
 Voice Actor: Miguel Sandoval

Golden Leon is Manny's ancestor and the 1st Rivera superhero. His costume is similar to the clothing of a Conquistador and speaks in Old English and Galician Spanish. His name means "Golden Lion". He is the son of Dark Leopard, father of the Mighty Cheetar, grandfather of Justice Jaguar, great-grandfather of Puma Loco, great-great grandfather of White Pantera, and Manny's great-great-great grandfather.

Mighty Cheetar
 Voice Actor: Eric Bauza

The Mighty Cheetar was Grandpapi's grandfather, The Justice Jaguar's father, Rodolfo's great-grandfather, and Manny's great-great grandfather. He was a supervillain like his grandson, who wore a more primitive steam-powered robot suit. The suit was used by Grandpapi in "Puma Licito" to save Manny and Frida from El Oso, and to protect his supervillain title. He appeared in "The Grave Escape" when Manny and Frida were transported to the Land of the Dead and he, along with Manny's other relatives, helped stop Sartana. He is known as the "Scourge of the Seven Seas" and speaks with a pirate accent.

Justice Jaguar
 Voice Actor: Héctor Elizondo

Justice Jaguar is Manny's great-grandfather, Rodolfo's grandfather, Puma Loco's father and is the son of the Mighty Cheetar. He dresses in a charro style costume, and he appeared riding a horse when Manny talked about him. He has a rough father-son relationship with Puma Loco, probably due to the fact that his son chose the path of villainy, but they greatly care about one another and miss each other. He apparently died attempting the "Rivera Super Macho Blitz", which was a super powerful and deadly attack, because he openly stated that "I know I didn't" after Puma Loco and White Pantera said how no one has ever survived the Blitz.

Heroes

Flama Dama
 Voice Actress: Grey DeLisle

Flama Dama is a superheroine who is one of White Pantera's friends. Her name means "Flaming Lady." She was among those that doubted that El Tigre had good in him until he saved the city from Sartana of the Dead's music that turned people evil with its popish beat.

Iron Piñata
 Voice Actor: John DiMaggio

Iron Piñata is a male superhero who is one of White Pantera's friends. He was among those that doubted that El Tigre has good in him until he saved the city from Sartana of the Dead.

Gordo Gordo
 Voice Actor: Jorge R. Gutierrez

Gordo Gordo is a fat superhero. His name means "fat fat".

League of Alliance Society

Silver Sombrero
 Voice Actor: Jeff Bennett

Silver Sombrero is the leader of the League of Alliance Society who uses a spinning silver sombrero as a weapon. He throws it and it spins around like a blade.

The Industrialist
 Voice Actor: Bruce Campbell

The Industrialist is a guardian of the friendless and a member of the League of Alliance Society. He shoots I-beams from a cannon on his arm and cement as well.

Cosmic Cleopatra
 Voice Actor: Erica Luttrell

Cosmic Cleopatra is a protector of the Earth and a member of the League of Alliance Society.

El Cucharón
 Voice Actor: Efren Ramirez

El Cucharón is a supervillain-turned-superhero who can control spoons. His name in English means "The Spoon". He helped El Tigre stop Dr. Chipotle Sr. and El Oso, who were trying to "reform" as well as himself, but decided to actually be good instead of the other two, who took advantage of Manny's mother and tried to rob a bank. After they are arrested, he tells Maria he is going to culinary school. He later served as a minister at the wedding of Puma Loco and Sartana of the Dead.

Seventh Samurai
 Voice Actor: George Takei

Seventh Samurai is a Japanese samurai-themed superhero and Toshiro's father. He is one of White Pantera's friends and has cleaned up crime in Shogun City. His name is a reference to the 1954 Akira Kurosawa film Seven Samurai.

Toshiro Watanabe/Cyber Sumo
 Voice Actor: Eric Bauza

Toshiro Watanabe is a japanese Sumo- themed superhero and Seventh Samurai's son. He is a humble and kind kid that gets trained by Manny to thought him up.

Main villains

Sartana of the Dead
 Voice Actor: Susan Silo

Sartana of the Dead is the most dangerous, most devious, and most feared supervillainess in all of Miracle City. From her lair in the abandoned prison cemetery, the 200-year-old Calaca Lady Sartana plots to overthrow Miracle City and rule it for herself and her grandson Django. By strumming her Golden Guitar of Doom, she can summon countless skeletons from the ground and send out rays of mystic energy to attack her foes with. The guitar is also her weakness because if the guitar is destroyed everything it rose from the dead (Sartana included) reverts to being dead. This is how she is normally defeated but she seems to somehow keep getting it back. No matter how many times she is destroyed, she comes back from the dead. Manny stole the guitar when he accidentally killed Zebra Donkey in an attempt to bring it back to life in time for the Zebra Donkey festival. On one occasion, she invited most of the villains in Miracle City to compete in her tournament during her "upcoming retirement"... which resulted in her accidental destruction. She at one point almost married Puma Loco/Grandpapi, but didn't because she wanted to destroy Manny which Granpapi refused to do. The series creator Jorge R. Gutierrez confirmed in later interviews that Sartana is a child of La Muerte and Xibalba from his 2014 film The Book of Life, ending up in the Land of the Living after losing her divinity from a broken heart.

Zoe Aves/Black Cuervo
 Voiced by: Candi Milo

Zoe Aves is a 13-year-old Argentine goth that is the super alter ego Black Cuervo II, who is the great-granddaughter of Black Cuervo I, and has her name translated to "Black Raven II". As a villainess,  she made her first appearance in the episode ""Enter the Cuervo". Her family clan is known as the "Flock of Fury". Just like the Rivera family who all have feline-themed alter egos, the Flock of Fury is made up of 
bird-themed alter egos. By day she's a typical goth loner, as she has the characteristic of tending not to make friends that easily, but when night falls she's Black Cuervo, a Raven-themed 
supervillainess who is much more full of life than the goth Zoe, their personalities contrasting. Unlike Manny, Zoe is able to balance her life as a teenager and a supervillainess without anyone 
knowing that Zoe and Black Cuervo are the same person. She is equipped with laser blasters on her wrists and jet wings on her back, as well as a sonic device she can use to send out a distress call 
to signal her family for help as well as a wrist communicator with a holographic interface. 
 
Oddly, despite her tough looks and sinister weaponry, she wears strawberry-scented perfume. Zoe has an evil mom named Voltura (the ex-girlfriend of White Pantera) and a really evil grandmother known as Lady Gobbler (the ex-girlfriend of Puma Loco) who have all had past relationships with the Rivera men. Zoe is no different. Zoe and Manny have a somewhat complicated relationship.

Way back in kindergarten, Zoe and Manny were best friends, but then, a girl named Frida Suárez came along, and Manny had to choose between Zoe and Frida. In the end, he chose Frida, throwing Zoe 
into the background. Because of this, Frida and Zoe were bitter enemies ever since, and the main reason they fight is because of Zoe's long-lasting crush on Manny, further complicating the love triangle relationship between Frida, Zoe, and Manny.

As Black Cuervo, she is still smitten by Manny/El Tigre but serves as his pseudonemesis and is more than a match for El Tigre in most cases. The two carry on this love/hate relationship throughout the series. In her "Enter the Cuervo", El Tigre develops a crush on Cuervo after she tricks him into thinking she likes him in order to get back at Frida for not inviting her to her birthday party. After discovering her plot, Tigre appears to lose interest in her for a time, but Cuervo in turn develops a crush on him. The roles are reversed in the episode "Tigre + Cuervo Forever" in which Cuervo's crush on Manny deepens when he tricks her into thinking he really likes her, so much so that she tells him he's "the best friend she ever had". She learns the truth and though Manny feels terrible for the betrayal and tries to make it up to her by telling her that "he would let her win" their impending fight, but this only makes her angrier and she swiftly gives him a good pummeling. At the end of the episode Cuervo proclaims that she is over El Tigre but pulls out a screw necklace he gave her earlier, and looks wide-eyed at it before saying "mostly" and flying off. In the episode "The Cuervo Project" she was able to do a group Science project all by herself, a scale model of the Miracle City Volcano with Manny and Frida as her partners. During the episode Frida suspects Zoe to be Black Cuervo and with the help of Manny tries to prove it, but just as she was caught and exposed as a supervillainess by El Tigre, her secret is kept intact thanks to the help of her grandmother who disguises herself as Black Cuervo and drops Zoe into her own model which was filled with ketchup, not lava. Cuervo's natural highlights are a dark purple, she has black and dark purple tights (similar to the ones when she wears her villainess disguise) and has two pairs of black gloves with the tops cut off. She can be seen as a parody of Spider-Man villains Black Cat and Vulture.

Carmelita Aves/Voltura
 Voice Actor: Grey DeLisle

Carmelita Aves/Voltura II is Zoe's mother and an old enemy of White Pantera. She is a vulture-themed villainess. She, like her daughter and mother, has sets of wings, but hers are always visible (unlike the other members), and two lasers that eject from both wrists. She also has a pair of headphones installed to talk to the other flock members, and a string harpoon shooter. When she was in high school, she was White Pantera's girlfriend until he broke up with her, possibly for his love of Maria. Whenever he is brought up, she claims to have broken up with him, but is always reminded that, "He broke up with you", to which she always says "As if I could forget!". She never told Zoe because she and Manny would become alike. She most likely brings up the talk of White Pantera breaking up with her around him because she still has feelings for him. Carmelita's true form was shown in "Tigre + Cuervo Forever". She was seen with short black hair and a green guacamole mask only above her eyes (which means she either has wrinkles or bags under her eyes). Carmelita works as an art teacher at Leone middle school and is friends with Maria only to get information about Rodolfo.

Grandmami Aves/Lady Gobbler
 Voice Actor: Carlos Alazraqui

Grandmami Aves/Lady Gobbler II is a turkey-themed villainess, and like both her daughter and granddaughter, will not let go of a past relationship with a Rivera, Grandpapi, who left her heartbroken at the church altar when he rode off with a different woman, possibly Rudolfo's mother. She has a turkey cane that transforms into a laser gun, and a glass eye with a video recorder in it. She is also the leader of the Flock of Fury.

Diego/Dr. Chipotle Jr.
 Voice Actor: Richard Steven Horvitz

Diego Jr. (a.k.a. Dr. Chipotle Jr.) is an evil 13-year-old mad scientist with a massive robotic metal arm and a cybernetic right eye. When Diego was just 7, he watched El Tigre put his father in jail and swore he'd get back at him some day. He uses strange weapons, such as "Zombie Guacamole", which is another thing he has in common with his father, who once robbed a bank using hot peppers mutated into monsters. He gets furious at the sound of Manny mispronouncing or completely messing up his name, such as "Dr. Habanera", "Dr. Paprika", "Dr. Jalapeño", "Dr. Chip & Dip", "Dr. Chimpanzee", "Dr. Chi-pantless", or "Dr. Chicken Pot Pie". He then yells out at the word "CHIPOTLE!!!". In his debut episode, Frida called him "Stinky Rameriaz's little brother". The Chipotles were one of the competitors of the Super-Villain Grand Prix and finished sixth place (because of El Tigre). He is also friends with Senor Siniestro, knows who he really is, and they sometimes play video games in his lair (with actual monsters they control outside). He also has a crush on Frida. As his alter ego, Diego, when he goes to school, his massive robotic arm is retracted and replaced with a normal one, and his cybernetic eye transforms into a pair of glasses, complete with a holographic eye. His shirt has a red chili on it, which serves as a nod of the monsters he creates and his alter ego name. It was stated on Jorge Gutierrez's DeviantArt page that Diego was created in a laboratory by accident. Envious of Manny's family, he created his own father and grandfather by cloning himself so he could have a family of his own (thus possibly explaining why he doesn't have a mother).

Dr. Chipotle Sr.
 Voice Actor: Richard Steven Horvitz

Diego Sr. (a.k.a. Dr. Chipotle Sr.) is the father of Dr. Chipotle Jr. and son of Dr. Chipotle Sr. Sr.. He was put away when his son was 7 years old by El Tigre and White Pantera. He was one of the villains that Maria Rivera tried to reform. However, he only used it as a cover to dig a tunnel into the Miracle City Mint. He acts and has a voice similar to his son's, he even has a massive robotic metal arm and a cybernetic right eye like his son. Dr. Chipotle Sr. is allergic to churros. He and his son also competed in the Super-Villain Grand Prix and were thrown at the skeleton banditos. It is unknown if he knows Senor Siniestro is Sergio because his son does.

Sergio/Señor Siniestro
 Voice Actor: Jeff Bennett

Sergio is a very small 12-year-old Italian boy who was transferred to Miracle City from Italy. On his first day at Leone Middle School, he foolishly wore his beloved cowboy costume, complete with his broomstick horse, Mr. Broomy Horse. Humiliation, unintentionally led by Manny, ensued and Sergio swore vengeance on Miracle City, especially Manny. Sergio uses a  robot suit to pose as an adult cowboy supervillain named Señor Siniestro. Señor Siniestro is usually found spewing cowboy lingo with an absurdly inaccurate Texan accent while looking for his foe and arch-nemesis, Manny Rivera/El Tigre. He was also one of the competitors of the Super-Villain Grand Prix, kicked the other competitors out of the race, got crushed by a crocodile and finished 2nd place over said crocodile. He also tried to make Manny and Frida late for school so they would be expelled. He also forced the students to build him a robotic horse suit which was destroyed by El Tigre. He has a huge crush on Frida. His supervillain name means "Mr. Sinister". He is friends with Dr. Chipotle Jr. and knows his real name. They sometimes play video games in his lair (which in reality is their actual creations fighting behind a screen to make it look pixelated). His name "Sergio", the fact that he is Italian and his love of cowboys are all nods to Sergio Leone the director of The Good, The Bad and The Ugly. Whenever he gets defeated, he'll say "okay, didn't see that coming".

El Oso
 Voice Actor: John DiMaggio

El Oso is a large, hairy Italian bear-themed thug with superhuman strength. He spends most of his time causing chaos in Miracle City. His name literally means "the bear" in English. In the episode "Oso Solo Mio", it was revealed that he was left behind as a baby on an orphanage camping trip and was raised by bears. He lives on the outskirts of Miracle City in Calavera. No matter how many times El Tigre puts El Oso behind bars, he manages to break out in time for dinner. He has the habit of punctuating his sentences with the word "mang".

General Chapuza
 Voice Actor: John DiMaggio

General Chapuza is a zombie who is the grave soccer coach of the team, The Zombies, who only speaks with a deep sinister voice.

Che Chapuza
 Voice Actor: Grey DeLisle

General Chapuza's grandson. Their name means "shoddy work". He is a good dancer and his favorite sport is soccer. In a rumored episode, "El Zombie Tigre", Che was going to be an evil copycat version of El Tigre called El Zombie Tigre.

Mustache Mafia
The Mustache Mafia is a crime family that can use their huge sentient mustaches in their crimes. It is led by Don Baffi and consists of Big Man, Knuckles, and Tiny.

Don Baffi
 Voice Actor: Jon Polito

Don Baffi is the leader of the Mustache Mafia.

In "Moustache Love," it is revealed that Don Baffi has a granddaughter named Sofia whose eyebrow named Browsia is in love with Raul.

Big Man
 Voice Actor: Jon Polito

Big Man is a member of the Mustache Mafia who is the strongest of the bunch.

Knuckles
 Voice Actor: Jeff Bennett

Knuckles is a skinny member of the Mustache Mafia who is the most panicky of the bunch.

Tiny
 Voice Actor: Carlos Alazraqui

Tiny is a member of the Mustache Mafia who is the smallest of the bunch.

Django of the Dead
 Voice Actor: Danny Cooksey

Django of the Dead is the grandson of Sartana of the Dead, who appears in The Good, The Bad, and The Tigre and can be seen with Sartana in "No Boots, No Belt, No Brero". He has his own Mystic Guitar, which allows him a portion of the power that Sartana wields (though, like Sartana's, Django's guitar is his weakness; if it's destroyed, he'll crumble into nothing). Django dislikes adults, and especially Sartana, which drives him to compete in Sartana's "retirement" competition to show them all up. The creator had said that Django would become more frequent in the next season.

Carla and Carlito Aves/The Golden Eagle Twins
 Voice Actor: Candi Milo

The Golden Eagle Twins II are twin teen supervillains, the cousins of Black Cuervo and the great-great-great-great-great-grandchildren of the Golden Eagle Twins I. As Carla and Carlito Aves, they try to appear to be clean-cut and respectable; however, they are actually mean and mischievous. They were new villainesses. It is implied by other people and even the villains they come in contact with that they really do put a walloping on the bad guys before they realize they could abuse their fame. Their powers are energy based, and oddly enough, the only eagle-themed ability they possess is their flight. When they join together they have the power to summon a very powerful energy-based, orb-like attack that can't be stopped as long as they are joined together. Eventually, El Tigre is unable to join Carla and Carlito because in the end he realizes they are more hypocrites, evil and dangerous than heroic. Frida continuously calls their Zeppelin "a blimp" to infuriate the twins.

Secondary villains
 Comrade Chaos (voiced by Jack Angel): A Russian retired supervillain who uses a special hammer and sickle as his weapons.
 El Tarántula (voiced by Carlos Alazraqui): A Spanish tarantula-themed retired supervillain. His catchphrase is "not a problem".
 Mano Negra (voiced by Charlie Adler): The preserved head of a Mexican retired supervillain who has a robot body with a super powerful metal hand. His name means "Black Hand" in English (a possible reference to DC Comics villain Black Hand).
 Calavera Banditos: Various criminals, evildoers, and baddies who live in the rough-neck town of Calavera which means "Skull" in English. There are some skeleton banditos who are Sartana of the Dead's minions.
 Titanium Titan (voiced by Rene Mujica): White Pantera's dwarfish, sidekick-turned supervillain. The Titanium Titan tried to fight alone, but failed and left the city where he went to a life of crime. He has titanium liquid metal arms that can transform into almost anything, like hammers or drills. He wants revenge on Manny Rivera/El Tigre for his misfortune and wants to make it so that he and White Pantera are together again. In "Silver Wolf," his plan was to disguise himself as Silver Wolf, a wolf-themed supervillain, to make Frida hang out with him so he could take her away. This was his plan to get revenge on El Tigre for stealing White Pantera from him by stealing Frida from El Tigre.
 El Mal Verde (voiced by Danny Trejo): White Pantera's archenemy and the most powerful and dangerous supervillain in the history of Miracle City. He is a large green ogre-like creature with an iron mace-like right arm that no hero has ever defeated. Mal Verde is a very common Spanish surname, but the way it is pronounced sounds quite similar as the words "Mal Verde" which literally means "green evil". White Pantera fled from battle from him so his family wouldn't be alone. Years later, White Pantera managed to help El Tigre defeat him, El Mal Verde is so large he makes his enemies hyperventilate. In the special episode "The Good, The Bad and the Tigre", El Mal Verde returns, but he's easily defeated this time alongside Giant Robot Sanchez and the Alebrije Monster.
 Ninja Monster Clan: A clan of ninja monsters who are the old enemies of the Seventh Samurai. The Ninja Monster clan goes after the Seventh Samurai's son Toshiro. At the end Toshiro beats them knocking them onto a train bound for jail.
 Monsterzuma (voiced by Clancy Brown): A monster with a draconic head for a left arm that wears a diamond in his crown and goes on a rampage if the diamond is stolen. He currently sleeps under the Miracle City volcano. He is known to smear thieves across the continent. Manny once stole his diamond to ruin the wedding of Puma Loco and Sartana of the Dead. Monsterzuma made an appearance in Sartana's tournament.
 Cactus Kid (voiced by Eric Bauza): A small-time Italian villain who wanted to make it big in Miracle City. He lived a sheltered life, where the town he lived in not only submitted to his villainy, they supported it completely, his parents are suggested to be literal cacti for reasons unknown. To make Manny jealous, Puma Loco takes him as an apprentice. When the Cactus Kid finds this out, his anger allows him to unlock the ability to control everything about cacti, even turn them into his minions. He calls his power over cacti "cactus control", a play on Chaos Control from the Sonic the Hedgehog series.
 Giant Robot Sanchez: A giant robot who lives with his wife and two kids in a ginormous city populated by robots, he often comes to Miracle City to do crime (presumably to pay for his family) however he stop his evil ways in "Mech Daddy" after Manny and Frida helped him spend time with his kids after getting his systems shutdown and controlled his body.
 The Bear King: Father of the Bear Princess.

Minor characters
 Emiliano "Chief" Suárez (voiced by Daran Norris): The Spanish chief of police for the Miracle City police department, Carmela's husband, and Frida, Nikita and Anita's father. He is overprotective over his daughter and distrusts Manny, saying that Frida always gets hurt when she hangs around him. He probably is the warden of the Miracle City Monster Jail.
 Carmela Suárez (voiced by Grey DeLisle): A beautiful Spanish Miracle City judge, Emiliano's wife, and Frida, Nikita and Anita's mother.
 Anita & Nikita Suárez (voiced by Grey DeLisle & April Stewart): The spoiled 15-year-old Spanish twin police girls, and Frida's bratty sisters. Because they are twins, they take turns of finishing their sentences as if they are one person.
 Mrs. Chichita (voiced by Candi Milo): A little old lady, seen in episodes "Enter the Cuervo," "Night of the Living Guacamole," and "Fool's Goal" (if one looked closely).
 Principal Tonino (voiced by Eric Bauza): The friendly principal of the school that Manny and Frieda attend. Unlike Vice-Principal Chakal, he is a good man and is friendly with students.
 Vice-Principal Chakal (voiced by Carlos Alazraqui): The by the book-type old vice-principal of the school that Manny and Frieda attend. He is a strict man, despises troublemaking children and is willing to have an excuse to expel them for their continued detentions and return to their tardiness. It is said he can expel Frida, but cannot expel Manny.
 Mrs. Lupita (voiced by Candi Milo): Manny's teacher in Leone Middle School. In the episode "El Tigre, El Jefe", she punishes Aaron Chokovich for not doing his homework in weeks. In the episode "The Thing That Ate Frida's Brain", she asks Frida about her Jamaican hat.
 The Popular Girls: Three popular teenage girls that are admired for their "beauty" and "popularity". One is Caucasian name Tattoo (voiced by Pamela Adlon) who dresses like a biker that has a blue tattoo on her left arm, the second is Asian name Patches (Grey Delisle) who dresses like a prisoner that has a bedazzled eyepatch on her left eye, and the third is Caribbean name Chainsaw (Grey Delisle) who dresses like a punk and has a chainsaw attached to her right hand. They all first appeared in the episode "Wrong and Dance".
 Humberto (voiced by Carlos Alazraqui): A stinky Puerto Rican kid with poor hygiene who smells.
 Davi Roccco/Albino Burrito (voiced by Jessica DiCicco): A small 11-year-old Italian boy who wants to be a superhero, as he was trained by Manny, although he was mainly being used to do chores. In the end, all the things that he is tricked into doing helps him defeat a giant robot made by Puma Loco.
 Raúl: Manny's mustache created for him by Dr. Chipotle Jr. because Manny wanted to be an adult. It was given to Manny using the power of his belt buckle. Raúl eventually left Manny's lip because they agreed that Manny was no longer ready for adulthood. As of "Miracle City Undercover," Raúl now works for Emiliano as an undercover cop. In "Mustache Love," Raul falls in love with Browsia, an eyebrow on Don Baffi's granddaughter Sofia.
 Municipal President Rodríguez (voiced by John DiMaggio): The municipal president of Miracle City. He demonstrates advertising put first and foremost. He is known for being very selfish, arrogant, lazy, and rude. In "Animales," it is revealed that he has a pet ram and rooster who are rivals with Senor Chapi and the family mule.
 Dr. Eugene L. Butterman (voiced by Eric Bauza): A dull veterinarian who first appeared in "Zebra Donkey". In "No Boots, No Belt, No Brero," the Miracle City Judge and Municipal President Rodriguez assign him as the Rivera's court-ordered family therapist after an altercation between White Pantera, El Tigre, and Puma Loco destroyed Municipal President Rodriguez's house. It was either this or they get put to work in the Onion Mines for 20 years. He orders the Riveras to give up their mystical objects of power until they start acting like a family. He then learns if someone tried to tell the Riveras to give up their mystical objects of power, this makes the villains happy with no Rivera's mystical objects to defeat them. When he saw this happen during the villain attack and when El Mal Verde bit off the roof of his building, he declared the Riveras "cured" and ran off.

Animal, creature, and monster characters
 Goat: A goat seen around Leone Middle School.
 Little Mule: Grandpapi Rivera's pet donkey who came along with Grandpapi when he moved in with Manny and Rodolfo. Little Mule is very good at balancing stuff on his ears like pots which was shown in "Sole of a Hero" but Manny and Frida weren't noticing. The Little Mule spends a lot of time doing donkey things and is protective of Grandpapi as seen in "Puma Licito" when Manny and Frida tried to retrieve his hat while he was sleeping, Little Mule has a (sombrero-shaped) chew toy with a photo picture of him, his parrot brother Señor Chapi, and the Riveras.
 Señor Chapi (voiced by Carlos Alazraqui): The Rivera family Yellow-billed Amazon parrot. A mean, dirty and tired-looking bird, his dialogue is "Viva pantalones!", and his favorite food is earwax. His fake girlfriend (a green feather duster) was thrown out the window by Manny.
 Guacamole Monster: A Guacamole monster created by Dr. Chipotle Jr. who was actually the first character to have the El Tigre powers other than Manny. It keeps trying to eat itself causing it to be constantly scolded by his creator. During the ending fight of the episode "Night of the Living Guacamole," it was tricked into eating itself. In "The Moustache Kid" it is revealed that other creatures are able to use his mystic belt buckle, giving it catlike ears, white tufts of hair on the sides of its head, and claw gloves.
 Zebra Donkey: Zebra Donkey is the beloved mascot of Manny's school and is perhaps an icon throughout Miracle City, appearing in children's toys, underpants (as seen in the episode "Frida's Ballad," where Santana of the Dead humiliated El Tigre into making his pants fall down, revealing that Manny has a pair of Zebra Donkey underpants), and in festive events in which he makes public appearances. In the episode "Zebra Donkey!" Zebra Donkey was accidentally killed by Manny after he gave him bananas, an apparent poison to the fictional zebra donkey species, but was brought back to life by Sartana of the Dead's guitar. Zebra Donkey still makes appearances after being turned into a zombie and is still a beloved mascot and donkey. Zebra Donkey is based on a combination of zebroids and an odd custom in Mexico.
 Alebrije Monster: A giant round monster with tentacles for arms and long legs. An alebrije is Mexico's traditional fantastical chimerical creature, created using parts of different animals. An Alebrije Monster took part in Sartana's tournament where it fought El Tigre alongside El Mal Verde and Giant Robot Sanchez. It also appears in the opening sequence.
 Dragon Worm: A dragon that travels around the world eating ingredients. The League of Alliance Society has been hunting it down, trying to prevent it from eating the ingredients that will make it invincible. The Silver Sombrero revealed that El Tigre was the final ingredient and the dragon swallowed him, thus making it invincible. The League failed to defeat it but White Pantera, who thinks it's a fake, unknowingly defeats it (with El Tigre's help by hitting the dragon's internal organs) and spits out El Tigre.
 Chui: A goat-eating chupacabra which is a creation of Dr. Chipotle, Jr, but then abandoned because he wanted a monster who eats throats and also was adopted by Manny Rivera. Chui risked his life to save Miracle City and Manny from a pepper mutation then, Chui was blasted off from the Miracle City volcano and landed near a goat farm. When Chui comes back he is now able to eat Mystic objects of power and gain the power.

References

Lists of characters in American television animation
Fictional Hispanic and Latino American people
Fictional Mexican people
El Tigre: The Adventures of Manny Rivera
Television characters introduced in 2007